The 1983 IAAF World Race Walking Cup was held on 24 and 25 September 1983 in the streets of Bergen, Norway.  The event was also known as IAAF Race Walking World Cup.

Complete results were published.

Medallists

Results

Men's 20 km

Men's 50 km

Team (men)
The team rankings, named Lugano Trophy, combined the 20 km and 50 km events team results.

Women's 10 km

Team (women)

Participation
The participation of 169 athletes (105 men/64 women) from 18 countries is reported.

 (8/4)
 (5/4)
 (8/4)
 (8/-)
 (-/4)
 (-/4)
 (7/4)
 (8/4)
 (8/-)
 (6/4)
 (8/4)
 (8/4)
 (7/4)
 (-/4)
 (-/4)
 (8/4)
 (8/4)
 (8/4)

Qualifying rounds 
From 1961 to 1985 there were qualifying rounds for the men's competition with the first two winners proceeding to the final.  This year, the German Democratic Republic, Italy, the Soviet Union, México, Norway, the United States, Australia, China, and Canada proceeded directly to the final.

Zone 1
London, United Kingdom, June 11

Zone 2
Bar-le-Duc, France, June 18/19

Zone 3
Trnava, Czechoslovakia, June 18

References

External links
IAAF World Race Walking Cup 1961-2006 Facts & Figures - IAAF.org

World Athletics Race Walking Team Championships
World Race Walking Cup
World Race Walking Cup
International athletics competitions hosted by Norway